Thomas Morgan Woodward (September 16, 1925 – February 22, 2019) was an American actor who is best known for his recurring role as Marvin "Punk" Anderson on the television soap opera Dallas and for his portrayal of Boss Godfrey, the sunglasses-wearing "man with no eyes", in the 1967 film Cool Hand Luke. On TV, he was a familiar guest star on cowboy shows. On the long-running Western Gunsmoke, he played 16 different characters in 19 episodes (including a pair of two-part stories), the most such appearances of any actor on the show. He also had a recurring role on The Life and Legend of Wyatt Earp.

Early years
Woodward was born in Fort Worth, Texas, the third of five sons of Dr. Valin Woodward and his wife, Frances McKinley. He grew up in Arlington, Texas, graduating from high school in 1944. After serving in the U.S. Army Air Corps during World War II, he enrolled at North Texas Agriculture College, where he was active in the theater. He graduated in 1948 with a bachelor's of business administration in finance. He attended law school at the University of Texas at Austin. During that time, he hosted a local radio talk show and sang with a barbershop quartet and a dance band.

Military service
Woodward was a member of the United States Army Air Force during World War II. He flew his first plane at the age of 16 years. He returned to the military during the Korean War in the now-Military Air Transport Service.

Acting career

Westerns
One of Woodward's longest television roles was in 42 episodes between 1958 and 1961 on the ABC television series The Life and Legend of Wyatt Earp as the deputy/sidekick "Shotgun" Gibbs. Woodward made a dozen guest appearances on Wagon Train between 1958 and 1965, and many appearances in Gunsmoke, Rawhide, and Bonanza.

In the 1966 episode "Hugh Glass Meets the Bear" of the syndicated anthology series, Death Valley Days, Woodward was cast as Thomas "Broken Hand" Fitzpatrick. John Alderson played Hugh Glass, who after being mauled by a bear and abandoned by Fitzpatrick, crawled 200 miles to civilization. Victor French portrayed Louis Baptiste, with Tris Coffin as Major Andrew Henry.

Star Trek
Woodward guest-starred in two episodes of the original series of Star Trek as two different characters. In the first-season episode, "Dagger of the Mind" (1966), Woodward plays Dr. Simon van Gelder, a deputy director of a facility for the criminally insane.  Later, he was cast in "The Omega Glory" in Star Treks second season, playing Captain Ron Tracey.  Woodward called the role of Dr. Simon Van Gelder the most physically and emotionally exhausting acting job of his career.

Dallas
Woodward was a familiar face on the television drama series Dallas from 1980–1989. His recurring role was Marvin "Punk" Anderson. As the series progressed, Woodward's role became that of a trusted advisor to the Ewing sons.

Recording
In 1963, Woodward recorded "Heartache City" backed with "An Encouraging Word" (CRC Charter 15).

Death
Woodward died on February 22, 2019, at his Hollywood Hills house in California.

Recognition
In 2009, Woodward was inducted into the Hall of Great Western Performers at the National Cowboy & Western Heritage Museum. In 1986, he was inducted into the Order of West Range of Pi Kappa Alpha fraternity.

In 1988, he received the Golden Lariat Award at the National Western Film Festival for his contributions to the Western genre. He won the Golden Boot Award given by the Hollywood Motion Picture and Television Fund.

Selected filmography
Woodward appeared in more than 250 television shows and films throughout his acting career.

Film appearances

 The Great Locomotive Chase (1956) - Alex
 Westward Ho, the Wagons! (1956) - Obie Foster
 Slaughter on Tenth Avenue (1957) - Tilly Moore (uncredited)
 Gunsight Ridge (1957) - Tex - Lazy Heart Ranch Hand
 Ride a Crooked Trail (1958) - Durgan (uncredited)
 The Gun Hawk (1963) - Deputy 'Mitch' Mitchell
 The Devil's Bedroom (1964)
 The Sword of Ali Baba (1965) - Captain of Guard
 Gunpoint (1966) - Drago Leon
 Cool Hand Luke (1967) - Boss Godfrey
 Firecreek (1968) - Willard
 Death of a Gunfighter (1969) - Ivan Stanek
 The Wild Country (1970) - Ab Cross
 Yuma (1971, TV Movie) - Arch King
 One Little Indian (1973) - Sgt. Raines
 Running Wild (1973) - Crug Crider
 The Midnight Man (1974) - Phillip Clayborne
 Ride in a Pink Car (1974) - Jeff Richman
 The Killing of a Chinese Bookie (1976) - The Boss
 A Small Town in Texas (1976) - C.J. Crane
 Supervan (1977) - T.B. Trenton
 Moonshine County Express (1977) - Sweetwater
 Walking Tall: Final Chapter (1977) - The Boss
 Speedtrap (1977) - Capt. Hogan
 Which Way Is Up? (1977) - Mr. Mann
 Battle Beyond the Stars (1980) - Cayman
 Girls Just Want to Have Fun (1985) - J.P. Sands
 Dark Before Dawn (1988) - J.B. Watson
 Gunsmoke: To the Last Man (1992, TV Movie) - Sheriff Abel Rose

TV appearances
Woodward made many other television guest appearances, including:

 Gunsmoke (1957–1974, 19 episodes) - Abraham Wakefield / Bear Sanderson / Lamoor Underwood / Walt Clayton / Luke Dangerfield / Quentin Sargent / Josh Stryker / Luke Brazo / Grant Lyle / Harl Townsend / Zack Johnson / Beaumont / Earl Miller / Ben Rucker / Sholo / Deeks / Calhoun
 Tales of Wells Fargo (1957-1961, 2 episodes) - Phil Slavin / Steve Taggart
 The Restless Gun (1958-1959, 3 episodes) - J.B. Cauter / Jubal Carney / Ben Cotterman
 Wagon Train (1958–1965, 12 episodes) - Clyde / Zach Ryker / Jute Pardee / Pocky / Ciel / Second Killer / Barney / Walt Keene / Chief Spotted Horse  / Jubal Ash / Jupe / Ben Lafferty
 The Life and Legend of Wyatt Earp (1958–1961, 80 episodes) - Shotgun Gibbs
 Bat Masterson (1960) - as Kana in S2E35 “The Big Gamble”
 Bonanza (1960–1971, 8 episodes) -  Sheriff Clyde Morehouse / Jess Waddle / Will McNabb / Luke Catlin / Mike Gillis / McDermott / Deputy Sheriff Rick Conley / Sheriff Biggs
 The Asphalt Jungle (1961, 1 episode) - Detective Kertz
 Perry Mason (1962, 1 episode) - Carl Pedersen
 Daniel Boone (1964 TV series) (1965) - Tom Sutton - S1/E16 "The First Stone"
 Days of Our Lives (1965) - Phillip Colville (1987-1988, 20 episodes)
 Daniel Boone (1964 TV series) (1965) - Elisha Tully - S2/E14 "The Christmas Story"
 The Lucy Show (1966, as a cowboy with John Wayne) - Pierce
 Star Trek (1966–1968, 2 episodes) - Captain Tracey / Dr. Simon van Gelder
 The High Chaparral (1970) - Billings
 Kung Fu (1972 TV series) (1973-1974, 2 episodes) - Col. Binns / The Hanged Man a.k.a The Adversary
 Planet of the Apes (TV Series) (1974) - Martin the blacksmith
 The Waltons (1974–1978, 2 episodes) - Boone Walton
 Logan's Run (1977–1978, 3 episodes as "Morgan") - Morgan
 How the West Was Won (1978-1979, 4 episodes) - The Stranger / Henry Coe
 Fantasy Island (1979-1982, 4 episodes) - Uncle Jack / Nick Hall / Tribal Elder / Marshall Victor Grennan
 The Dukes of Hazzard''' (1980–1984, 2 episodes) - 1: The season 2 episode "Mason Dixon's Girls", in which he played a drug lord named Dempsey, and 2: The seventh-season episode "Cool Hands Luke & Bo". where he spoofed his character of Boss Godfrey, as Colonel Cassius Claiborne.
 Dallas (1980–1987, 55 episodes) - Marvin "Punk" Anderson (oilman and best friend of Jock Ewing)
 Hill Street Blues (1982, 5 episodes) - John Renko
 The Fall Guy (1982-1985, 2 episodes) - LV Vernon / Reuben
 The A-Team (1983–1987, 2 episodes, as Bus Carter in the 2nd season 2 part episode "When You Comin' Back, Range Rider?" and as Captain Winnetka in the season 3 episode "Showdown")
 The X-Files (Aubrey) (1995) - Old Harry Cokely
 Millennium'' (1997) - Iron Lung Man (final appearance)

References

External links
 
 
 
 Official website

1925 births
2019 deaths
American male film actors
American male television actors
Male actors from Fort Worth, Texas
University of Texas at Arlington alumni
Male actors from Los Angeles
Western (genre) television actors
20th-century American male actors
Male Western (genre) film actors
20th-century American male singers
20th-century American singers
Singers from California
Singers from Texas
United States Army Air Forces personnel of World War II
United States Air Force personnel of the Korean War